Bakeyevo (Baqıy) is a rural locality (a selo) and the administrative centre of Bakeyevsky Selsoviet, Sterlibashevsky District, Bashkortostan, Russia. The population was 507 as of 2010. There are 6 streets.

Geography 
Bakeyevo is located 13 km southeast of Sterlibashevo (the district's administrative centre) by road. Novonikolayevka is the nearest rural locality.

References 

Rural localities in Sterlibashevsky District